Acacia signata is a tree or shrub belonging to the genus Acacia and the subgenus Juliflorae that is endemic to western Australia.

Description
The pendulous or arching branchlets are often covered in a fine white powder. Like most species of Acacia it has phyllodes rather than true leaves. The evergreen phyllodes usually have a pendulous forn with a linear to linear-elliptic shape and are straight to slightly curved. It blooms from August to October producing yellow flowers. The inflorescences occur in groups of one to four flower-spikes with a cylindrical shape. The coriaceous seed pods that form after flowering have a curved to linear shape and are raised over seeds.

Taxonomy
The species was first formally described in 1863 by the botanist Ferdinand von Mueller as published in the work Fragmenta Phytographiae Australiae.

Distribution
It is found around Hamelin Pool in the north to around Cockleshell Gully in the south and as far east as Wubin but is not commonly occurring.

See also
List of Acacia species

References

signata
Acacias of Western Australia
Taxa named by Ferdinand von Mueller
Plants described in 1863